Simon Digby may refer to:

Politicians
Simon Digby (died 1560), MP for Rutland
 Simon Digby, 4th Baron Digby (1657–1686), English nobleman and Member of Parliament
 Simon Wingfield Digby (1910–1998), British Conservative politician

Others
 Simon Digby (died 1519), lord of Coleshill, Warwickshire, England
 Simon Digby (oriental scholar) (1932–2010), British oriental scholar, linguist and writer
 Simon Digby (bishop) (died 1720),  Bishop of Limerick, Ardfert and Aghadoe; then Elphin